The 1913 Men's World Weightlifting Championships were held in Breslau, Germany from July 28 to July 29, 1913. There were 40 men in action from 4 nations.

Medal summary

Medal table

References
Results (Sport 123)
Weightlifting World Championships Seniors Statistics

External links
International Weightlifting Federation

World Weightlifting Championships
World Weightlifting Championships
World Weightlifting Championships
International weightlifting competitions hosted by Germany